The South-East Province was an electoral region of the Western Australian Legislative Council, introduced after the introduction of responsible government in the 1890s. It initially comprised Williams, Plantagenet, and Albany Electoral Districts.

Members

References

Former electoral provinces of Western Australia
1894 establishments in Australia
1989 disestablishments in Australia